Samoklęski  is a village in the administrative district of Gmina Kamionka, within Lubartów County, Lublin Voivodeship, in eastern Poland.

Notable residents 
 Piotr Wesołowski (1977-???) – Polish journalist currently working for Przegląd Sportowy

References

Villages in Lubartów County